The Singapore National Stadium is a multi-purpose stadium in Kallang, Singapore, and is the national stadium of Singapore. Opened on 30 June 2014, it was constructed on the site of the former National Stadium, which was closed in 2007 and demolished in 2010. The 55,000-seat facility serves as the home stadium of the Singapore national football team, and is the centrepiece of the Singapore Sports Hub project—a sports and recreation district that also incorporates nearby Singapore Indoor Stadium and other sporting  venues.

One of the largest domed structures in the world, it features a naturally-ventilated design with a retractable roof, and has configurations for football, rugby, athletics and cricket. The stadium served as the main venue of the 2015 Southeast Asian Games, and has hosted matches of the AFF Championship in 2014, 2018, 2020 and 2022.

History
In 2007, the Singapore government accepted bids for a project to build a new National Stadium and an accompanying sports and recreation district around the stadium (including an aquatics centre). Alpine Mayreder proposed a design inspired by Munich's Allianz Arena, Singapore Gold proposed a design known as "Premier Park" (which would have featured a retractable roof usable as a projection screen), while the Singapore Sports Hub Consortium (SSHC) proposed a design known as the "Cool Dome", a ventilated, horseshoe-inspired stadium with a retractable roof.

On 19 January 2008, the government named SSHC as its preferred bidder for the Sports Hub project and stadium, with construction slated to be completed by 2011. Minister of Community Development, Youth and Sports Vivian Balakrishnan stated that the SSHC proposal was the "strongest in offering a comprehensive sporting calendar", and "displayed significant strengths in programming, team culture and partnership, functionality and layout".

Construction of the stadium began in 2010 due to the delays caused by the 2008 financial crisis and soaring construction costs. By September 2011, the pilling and the foundation of the stadium was completed and construction on the steelworks of the stadium fixed roof started. In July 2013, the installation of the stadium final primary steel 'runway truss' for the roof was completed marking the completion of the steelworks on the National Stadium's fixed roof in preparation for installation of the retractable roof. The stadium was set to be completed in April 2014. In February 2014, Sports Hub CEO Philippe Collin Delavaud announced that it would miss the deadline, and not open until June 2014.

The stadium's first sporting event was the inaugural World Club 10s rugby tens tournament in June 2014.

Design 

Due to Singapore's tropical climate, the stadium's roof is designed to reflect sunlight in order to insulate its interior, while natural airflow is used to cool spectator areas with less energy usage than a venue of comparable size.

The stadium has configurations for football, rugby, athletics, and cricket. In its football and rugby configuration, the lowest tier of seating can be moved forward (covering the running track) to provide a more intimate experience. It takes approximately 48 hours to reconfigure seating arrangements to suit an upcoming event.

Playing surface 
The stadium initially used Desso GrassMaster—which consists of natural grass interwoven with synthetic fibres—as its playing surface. After experiencing issues with the pitch's quality (which culminated in the New Zealand All Blacks cancelling a rugby match at the stadium during a November 2014 tour due to safety concerns), in May 2015 the GrassMaster surface was replaced by Eclipse Stabilised Turf—a similar hybrid surface produced by Australian company HG Turf.

Singapore Sports Hub CEO Oon Jin Teik stated that the stadium's unique microclimate had posed additional challenges in maintaining the GrassMaster pitch.

Transport

Mass Rapid Transit
The stadium is located above the underground Stadium MRT station on the Circle Line. Trains arrive every five to six minutes during off-peak hours, and two to three minutes during peak hours and event days. Other MRT stations nearby are Kallang MRT station which can be accessed using a sheltered walkway, and Mountbatten MRT station. The upcoming Tanjong Rhu MRT station will complement the existing stations once completed in 2024.

Buses and taxis
Bus stops are located around the Sports Hub complex along Stadium Walk, Stadium Boulevard and Nicoll Highway, with buses serving nearby districts and the city. Taxi stands are also conveniently available near the National Stadium, Singapore Indoor Stadium and Leisure Park Kallang.

Notable events

Sports

SEA Games 
The stadium was one of the venues of the 2015 Southeast Asian Games, hosting the opening and closing ceremonies, athletics, and football.

Football 

The first football match held at the stadium is a friendly match between Singapore Selection XI and Juventus in August 2014. The friendly match between Brazil and Japan in October 2014 was the first sell-out crowd of 55,000 at the stadium. It also hosted the 2014 AFF Suzuki Cup in November 2014. It is the venue of all the matches of the 2015 Barclays Asia Trophy that is held in Singapore.

In 2018, as a participant in the 2018 AFF Championship, Singapore played two matches at the stadium for the group stages as the home team.

On 15 July 2022, the stadium served as the venue for the Standard Chartered Singapore Trophy 2022 pre-season friendly between Premier League clubs Liverpool and Crystal Palace with 50,217 fans in attendance.

Rugby 
The stadium's inaugural event was the inaugural World Club 10s tournament in June 2014.

Concerts

National Day Parade
On 9 August 2016, the new National Stadium hosted Singapore's National Day Parade (NDP). The event had been frequently held at the old National Stadium in the past, and had been temporarily held at The Float at Marina Bay–a temporary venue on Marina Bay built to host outdoor sports and cultural events while the new National Stadium was being constructed. The design of the stadium resulted in limitations and modifications to the event, including the traditional military flypast and fireworks being obstructed by the stadium's dome, armoured military vehicles being unable to drive on the stadium's tracks, and the Red Lions being unable to parachute into the dome due to safety concerns. The parade thus incorporated different features, such as light shows (including a segment featuring models of Singaporean landmarks illuminated with projection mapping effects), large "puppets", and other artistic presentations.

The event faced mixed reception for its increased costs over the event held at The Float. Under the contract between the Sports Hub and Singapore Government, NDP organisers were allowed 45 days of free annual usage of the venue. However, technicians and performers reported that the time frame needed to be extended to 80 days, to which the Sports Hub requested an additional $26 million but was reportedly reduced to $10 million.

In October 2017, it was announced that The Float would be redeveloped as a permanent venue known as NS Square, and serve as the primary venue for the NDP when not held at The Padang every five years. The decision raised questions over whether the costs of renting the stadium would diminish the legacy that the former National Stadium had as a site for community events. Contrarily, it was argued that not hosting the NDP at the new National Stadium would free up its schedule for major international sporting events, especially during the summer months. Bids to host the Asia Masters Athletics Championships and the Merlion Cup at the stadium had also previously been stalled by costs demanded by the facility. With the construction of NS Square expected to begin in 2023 and last through 2026, organisers stated that the 2024 NDP could return to the new National Stadium.

Religious gatherings 
In May 2019, the National Stadium hosted the Celebration of Hope, a three-day evangelistic event led by Rennis Ponniah.

See also
 List of Southeast Asia stadiums by capacity
 List of stadiums in Singapore
 Sport in Singapore

References

External links

Singapore Sports Council official website
Singapore Sports Hub official website

Kallang
Cricket grounds in Singapore
Football venues in Singapore
Retractable-roof stadiums
Rugby union stadiums in Singapore
2014 establishments in Singapore
Sports venues completed in 2014
Sunwolves
World Rugby Sevens Series venues
Southeast Asian Games stadiums
Southeast Asian Games athletics venues
Southeast Asian Games football venues
21st-century architecture in Singapore